Hyaea or Hyaia was a town in Ozolian Locris. Thucydides writes that during the Peloponnesian War, Hyaea was among the cities of Ozolian Locris that refused to provide hostages to the Spartan army under Eurylochus in 426 BCE until the city was taken by force.

Its site is unlocated.

References

Populated places in Ozolian Locris
Former populated places in Greece
Lost ancient cities and towns